Tide Water Pumping Station, also known as Benton Station and SOHIO Pumping Station, is a historic pumping station complex and national historic district located in Harrison Township, Clay County, Indiana. The complex includes the -story, brick gale roofed pump house (1915); frame warehouse; a metal shed; two Queen Anne style dwellings; a metal garage; a concrete sluice and bridges; and the remains of a tennis court, dam and pond, and buried pipes.  It is one of 14 pumping stations built along a 546.16 mile oil pipeline built between Crawford County, Illinois and Rixford, Pennsylvania. The station closed about 1957.

It was added to the National Register of Historic Places in 1999.

References

Industrial buildings and structures on the National Register of Historic Places in Indiana
Queen Anne architecture in Indiana
Infrastructure completed in 1915
Historic districts in Clay County, Indiana
National Register of Historic Places in Clay County, Indiana
Historic districts on the National Register of Historic Places in Indiana